Ramghat may refer to:

Ramghat, Bheri, Nepal
Ramghat, Lumbini, Nepal